Tirupattur is a state assembly constituency in Vellore district in Tamil Nadu, India. Its State Assembly Constituency number is 50. It is one of the 234 State Legislative Assembly Constituencies in Tamil Nadu, in India.
Most successful party: DMK (9 times).

Since 2016 Tirupattur assembly constituency is represented in the Tamil Nadu Legislative Assembly by A Nallathambi of DMK party. He was reelected in 2021.

Madras State

Tamil Nadu

Election results

2021

2016

2011

2006

2001

1996

1991

1989

1984

1980

1977

1971

1967

1962

1957

1952

References 

 

Assembly constituencies of Tamil Nadu
Vellore district